The 2013–14 season was the 64th season in which Crawley Town played senior football, and the eight as a fully professional team. Crawley Town competed in Football League One for the second consecutive season, the third tier of English football, following automatic promotion from League Two during the 2011–12 season. They finished 14th in League One, and also competed in the FA Cup, Football League Cup and Football League Trophy, where they were eliminated in the second round, first round and second round respectively.

First-team squad 

Players' ages are as of 1 August 2013.

Competitions

League One

League table

Matches

FA Cup

League Cup

Football League Trophy

Transfers

In

Out

Loans in

Loans out

Player statistics

Appearances and goals

References

Crawley Town F.C. seasons
Crawley Town